Charles Richard Maxwell (born April 8, 1927), nicknamed "Smokey", "Paw Paw", "Sunday Punch", and "Sunday Charlie", is an American former professional baseball outfielder. He played 15 seasons in Major League Baseball with the Boston Red Sox (1950–54), Baltimore Orioles (1955), Detroit Tigers (1955–62), and Chicago White Sox (1962–64).

Career overview
Maxwell was an agile left fielder who led all American League outfielders in fielding percentage in 1957 (.997) and 1960 (.996). He had only one error in both years. He was also one of the top power hitters in baseball during his peak years with the Detroit Tigers from 1956 to 1960, finishing four times among the league leaders in home runs. Maxwell was elected to the American League All-Star team in 1956 and 1957. Maxwell's nicknames included "The South Paw From Paw Paw," (given by the Detroit Tigers announcer Van Patrick because of Maxwell's unusually-named hometown of Paw Paw, Michigan), "Smokey," "Sunday Charlie", and "the Sabbath Smasher," the latter two given in recognition of his propensity for hitting home runs on Sundays.

Early years
Born in Lawton, Michigan in 1927, Maxwell played baseball for Western Michigan University in 1945 before being drafted into the U.S. Army. After two years in the military, Maxwell played parts of seven seasons in the minor leagues (1947–53) before reaching the majors on a full-time basis. Signed by the Boston Red Sox, Maxwell spent three years (1947–49) playing for the Red Sox minor league team in Roanoke, Virginia. In 1949, Maxwell won the Triple crown in the Class B Piedmont League, with a .345 batting average, 29 home runs, and 112 RBIs. On May 25, 1949, Maxwell capped a comeback from 13–4 deficit with a two-out, three-run homer in the ninth inning.

In 1950, Maxwell hit .320 with 25 home runs for Birmingham in the Double-A Southern Association. After hitting four home runs in the post-season for Birmingham, Maxwell was called up to the big leagues for the last week of the 1950 season. Maxwell went hitless in nine plate appearances for the Red Sox in 1950. In 1951, Maxwell remained with the Red Sox but saw limited playing time as the backup left fielder for Ted Williams. His batting average in 1951 was .188. Things went from bad to worse in 1952, as Maxwell managed only one hit in 15 at-bats. In 1953, Maxwell turned things around, playing the full season for Louisville of the Triple-A American Association, and finishing the year with a .305 batting average, 23 home runs and 107 RBIs. Maxwell's strong performance in Louisville and Williams' broken collarbone resulted in Maxwell being the Red Sox starting left fielder at the start of the 1954 season. In mid-May, Williams returned to the lineup, and Maxwell, to the bench. In the off-season, the Red Sox sold Maxwell to the Baltimore Orioles, but Maxwell had only four at-bats for the Orioles before being sold to the Detroit Tigers on May 9, 1955.

Peak years with Detroit (1956–1960)
Maxwell remained with the Tigers from 1955 to 1962, serving as the teams' regular left fielder from 1956 to 1960. After being platooned in Detroit's outfield in 1955, the 1956 season was Maxwell's first as an every-day player, and his performance won him a spot on the 1956 American League All-Star team. Maxwell played 141 games for the Tigers in 1956 and finished among the American League leaders in most batting categories with a .534 slugging percentage (3rd in the AL behind Mickey Mantle and Ted Williams); a .326 batting average (4th in AL); a .414 on-base percentage (4th in the AL); 96 runs (4th in the AL); 28 home runs (5th in the AL); and 87 RBIs (5th in the AL). Maxwell also excelled in the field in 1956, with a .987 fielding percentage. He often gave a pregame show for the fans, especially on Saturdays when the Tigers hosted kids from the "Knothole Gang." "Shagging fungoes in left field, Maxwell would grin, clown around, and catch the ball behind his back or between his legs." ("Charlie Maxwell," by Jim Sargent)

At age 30, Maxwell followed up with another strong season in 1957, winning a spot on the American League All-Star team for the second straight year. Having committed only four errors in 1956, Maxwell improved his performance in 1957, committing only one error in over 300 chances. He led all AL outfielders with a .997 fielding percentage. And his 2.36 Range factor in left field was 0.39 points above the average for all outfielders. Maxwell also continued his strong hitting in 1957. Though his batting average dipped by 50 points to .276, he finished with a .377 on-base percentage (8th in the AL), .482 slugging percentage, 24 home runs (7th in the AL). "I was a tougher clutch hitter late in the game," Maxwell recalled. "Sportswriter Hal Middlesworth told me that I led the team in game-winning hits in 1956 and 1957, even though other guys hit for higher averages." ("Charlie Maxwell," by Jim Sargent)

After a less than stellar performance in 1958 (13 home runs and 65 RBIs), the Tigers signed Larry Doby to replace Maxwell for the 1959 season. Doby fizzled with the Tigers (.218 in 18 games), however, and was traded on May 13, leaving the left field spot open for Maxwell to reclaim. Maxwell posted career-highs in 1959 with 31 home runs (4th in the AL) and 95 RBIs (5th in the AL). Maxwell hit home runs in four consecutive at-bats during a Sunday afternoon doubleheader in May and hit 12 of his 31 home runs in 1959 on Sundays—leading fans, writers and broadcasters to refer to him as "Sunday Charlie" and "the Sabbath Smasher." In 1960, Maxwell's batting average dropped to .237, though he still hit 24 home runs and batted in 84 runs. Maxwell's defensive performance remained strong in 1960, as he led all American League outfielders in fielding percentage for the second time in his career. He committed only one error in over 1,000 innings in left field, for a .996 fielding percentage.

Later years (1961–1964)
In 1961, slugger Rocky Colavito took over Maxwell's spot in left field. Colavito hit 45 home runs and 140 RBIs, and Maxwell was relegated principally to a pinch hitting role. After batting .194 in 30 games in 1962, the Tigers traded Maxwell to the Chicago White Sox on June 25, 1962. Maxwell had a late season revival with the White Sox in 1962. By the third week of August, Maxwell was batting .352 for Chicago, and had a 13-game hitting streak, the team's longest that year. Maxwell wound up hitting .296 for the White Sox in 1962 with nine home runs. Maxwell also continued his "Sunday Charlie" tendencies with the White Sox, hitting five of his nine home runs in 1962 on Sundays, including 3 home runs during a Sunday doubleheader in July.

Maxwell's batting average dropped to .231 in 1963, and he managed only three home runs. The White Sox released Maxwell in April 1964 after Maxwell went hitless in two pinch-hitting appearances. In a 14-season career, Maxwell was a .264 hitter with 148 home runs and 532 RBIs in 1,133 games. Excellent defensively, Maxwell posted a .988 fielding percentage playing at first base and left and right field.

Life after baseball
After his baseball career ended, Maxwell returned to his home in Paw Paw, Michigan, where he sold automobile parts. In 1997, Maxwell was inducted into the Michigan Sports Hall of Fame. Charlie Maxwell Days were celebrated in August 2010 in Paw Paw with the renaming of the Paw Paw field to the "Charlie Maxwell Ball Diamond".

References

External links

 Charlie Maxwell - Baseballbiography.com
 
 Official Web Site for Bound Stems

1927 births
Living people
American League All-Stars
Baltimore Orioles players
Baseball players from Michigan
Birmingham Barons players
Boston Red Sox players
Chicago White Sox players
Detroit Tigers players
Louisville Colonels (minor league) players
Major League Baseball left fielders
People from Longboat Key, Florida
People from Paw Paw, Michigan
People from Van Buren County, Michigan
Roanoke Red Sox players
Scranton Red Sox players
Western Michigan Broncos baseball players
United States Army personnel of World War II
Wellsville Nitros players